Air Commodore Patrick Desmond Callaghan (16 July 1926 – 6 April 1992) was a one-star air officer in the Pakistan Air Force who is credited for his pioneering work in Flight safety in Pakistan.

Military career

Early days
He was commissioned into the Royal Indian Air Force (RIAF) as a Pilot Officer on 17 September 1945. Early in his commissioned service, he was posted to the RIAF base at Kohat in 1946. He flew a variety of aircraft including Spitfires. In 1946, Callaghan belly landed his aircraft at Kohat airfield. The aircraft's engine had caught fire after an oil leak during landing practice. The aircraft was later written off in 1947.
At the partition of India in August 1947, he opted to serve with the Pakistan Air Force (PAF), and later married Maureen Viegas, whose sister, Jeanne, would later marry Mervyn Middlecoat, who went on to command the PAF's famed No. 9 Squadron and become a hero of the PAF.
On 1 September 1951 a PAF two seater Fury aircraft caught fire. Now Flight Lieutenant Callaghan was the second pilot on that flight.

One of the pioneer officers of the PAF, Callaghan served for a number of the early years of the PAF as a flight instructor at Risalpur, where he helped to train many of the PAF's future leaders and top fighter and bomber pilots (including his brother-in-law through marriage, Mervyn Middlecoat).

1965 War
During the September 1965 war, although a "desk jockey" in Peshawar, he volunteered for and flew dangerous low, low level night-time strafing missions in old Harvards along the Grand Trunk Road between Lahore and Amritsar harassing Indian Army convoys.
Years later, as a Group Captain, he led the PAF team that investigated the crash of a PAF C-130 after it went missing while returning to Pakistan from China. This investigation was conducted at high altitude in mountainous country and was particularly trying and hazardous.
By 1969 he had risen through the ranks of Squadron Leader and Wing Commander, working in staff jobs in Kohat and Peshawar, after earlier being based at Mauripur, (Karachi).

1971 War
In 1971, Air Commodore Callaghan was the PAF Chief Inspector, in charge of the verification of Pakistani claims of enemy aircraft kills. Working closely with him was the then United States air attache/adviser to the PAF, USAF Brigadier General Charles "Chuck" Yeager (the first man to break the sound barrier). 

After retiring from the PAF, Air Commodore Callaghan headed the Air Safety Branch of the Department of Civil Aviation and his internationally recognized expertise in investigating and solving the causes of air crashes led to his call out by a number of Arab countries to help them solve a number of crashes in their countries.

Callaghan died in April 1992 at the age of 65.

References

1926 births
1992 deaths
Aviation safety pioneers
Pakistan Air Force officers
Pakistani aviators
Pakistani Christians
Pakistani people of Anglo-Indian descent
Pakistani military personnel of the Indo-Pakistani War of 1971
Pilots of the Indo-Pakistani War of 1965